Elections to the French National Assembly were held in the Comoros on 4 March 1973 as part of the wider French parliamentary elections. The result was a victory for the List for the French Republic, which won both seats. The seats were taken by Mohamed Dahalani and Mohamed Ahmed.

Results

References

Comoros
Elections in the Comoros
1973 in the Comoros